Thunderfoot may refer to:

Nickname
 Thunderf00t, the pseudonym of the British chemist and video blogger Phil Mason (born 1972)
 Thunderfoot (wrestler), Joel Deaton (born 1957), American professional wrestler from the Thunderfoots
 Gene Ligon, the second of the Thunderfoots; See List of former Central States Wrestling personnel
 Hwang Jang-lee (born 1944), Japanese-born Korean martial artist and film actor

American football punters
 Herman Weaver (born 1948)
 Jerrel Wilson (1941–2005)
 Lee Johnson (punter) (born 1961)

Fictional entities
 Littlefoot, a character in The Land Before Time, originally called Thunderfoot
 Thunderfoot, the indigenous American clan of T. Hawk in the Street Fighter series
 Thunderfoot, in the list of DC Comics characters: B
 Col. Thunderfoot, a rabbit colonel in List of Fables characters
 Thunderfoot, a chasmosaurus in the Dinotopia series

Music
 "Thunderfoot", a track on the album Sudan Village by Seals & Crofts
 Thunderfoot, a Southern hard-rock band formed by Kevin Fowler
 Thunderfoot, an album by Hobo Jim

See also
 Thunder, in the List of Watership Down characters